Abdul Mazid is a Bangladeshi politician and the incumbent Member of Parliament from Sunamganj-5.

Career
Mazid was elected to Parliament from Sunamganj-5 as a Jatiya Party candidate in 1991.

References

Living people
5th Jatiya Sangsad members
Year of birth missing (living people)
Jatiya Party politicians